Marinus of Tyre (Marînos ho Týrios;  70–130) was a Greek geographer, cartographer and mathematician, who founded mathematical geography and provided the underpinnings of Claudius Ptolemy's influential Geography.

Life
Marinus was originally from Tyre in the Roman province of Syria. His work was a precursor to that of the great geographer Claudius Ptolemy, who used Marinus' work as a source for his Geography and acknowledges his great obligations to him. Ptolemy said, "Marinus says of the merchant class generally that they are only intent on their business, and have little interest in exploration, and that often through their love of boasting they magnify distances." Later, Marinus was also cited by the Arab geographer al-Masʿūdī. Beyond this, little is known of his life.

Legacy

Marinus' geographical treatise is lost and known only from Ptolemy's remarks. He introduced improvements to the construction of maps and developed a system of nautical charts. His chief legacy is that he was the first to assign to each place a proper latitude and longitude. His zero meridian ran through the westernmost land known during his time, the Isles of the Blessed, around the location of the present-day Canary or Cape Verde Islands. He used the parallel of Rhodes for measurements of latitude.

Ptolemy mentions several revisions of Marinus' geographical work, which is often dated to AD 114, although this is uncertain.

Marinus also carefully studied the works of his predecessors and the diaries of travelers. His maps were the first in the Roman Empire to show China. He invented equirectangular projection, which is still used in map creation today. A few of Marinus' opinions are also reported by Ptolemy. Marinus was of the opinion that the World Ocean was separated into an eastern and a western part by the continents of Europe, Asia and Africa. He thought that the inhabited world stretched in latitude from Thule (Norway) to Agisymba (around the Tropic of Capricorn) and in longitude from the Isles of the Blessed (around the Canaries) to Shera (China). Marinus also coined the term Antarctic, referring to the opposite of the Arctic Circle.

In 1935, an impact crater on the Moon was named after Marinus.

See also
List of Graeco-Roman geographers
 1st century in Lebanon

References

Attribution

A. Forbiger, Handbuch der alten Geographie, vol. i. (1842);
E. H. Bunbury, Hist. of Ancient Geography (1879), ii. p. 519;
E. H. Berger, Geschichte der wissenschaftlichen Erdkunde der Griechen (1903).
"Marinus" in Brill's New Pauly (Brill, 2010)

External links

https://web.archive.org/web/20080314171517/http://www.tmth.edu.gr/en/aet/3/66.html
http://www.dioi.org/gad.htm

70 births
130 deaths
Ancient Greek geographers
Ancient Greek cartographers
Ancient Greek writers
Syrian geographers
Syrian cartographers
Roman-era geographers
People from Tyre, Lebanon
1st-century geographers
2nd-century geographers